The Minolta Maxxum 4 (Dynax 4 in Europe and Dynax 3 in "Asia Pacific countries") 35mm SLR camera was introduced in 2002. Konica Minolta has discontinued production of this model but maintains information on it in its website.

Capable of automatic focus, the Maxxum 4 has through-the-lens metering, a built-in pop-up flash and a hot shoe for flash. The shutter is an "electronically-controlled, vertical-traverse, focal-plane type." It uses infrared sensors to focus, so for this reason the camera's manual advises against using it for infrared photography.

In addition to the essential modes P, A, S and M, the Maxxum 4 has all the usual quick-modes for the beginner: portrait, landscape, close-up, sports and night portrait. As with comparable film cameras of the period, the Maxxum 4 has multiple-frame drive mode, and self-timer; the maximum speed for continuous shooting is just short of two frames per second. Also, like other similar cameras, the Maxxum 4 has a built-in pop-up flash as well as a shoe for a dedicated flash with TTL flash control.

The camera has three autofocus sensors. The centre one is a cross-type sensor. To achieve focus outside the "Wide Focus Area" covered by these three sensors, the manual instructs the user to center the desired subject for focus, engage focus lock, then recompose the shot. This is standard procedure for autofocus systems of this type.

Any standard 35mm still-film (135 format) may be used with a few caveats: Polaroid 35mm instant film should not be used because "winding problems may occur"; infrared film is not recommended because the frame counter shines infrared light at the sprockets (this is a very common feature with motorised film-advance cameras); the camera can not advance beyond the 40th frame in rolls of film with more than 40 frames.

External links
 Konica Minolta page on Maxxum 4

135 film cameras
4Maxxum